Two human polls comprised the 1975 National Collegiate Athletic Association (NCAA) Division I football rankings. Unlike most sports, college football's governing body, the NCAA, does not bestow a national championship, instead that title is bestowed by one or more different polling agencies. There are two main weekly polls that begin in the preseason—the AP Poll and the Coaches Poll.

Legend

AP Poll

Coaches Poll
For the second year, the final UPI Coaches Poll was released after the bowl games, on January 2, 1976.Oklahoma received 21 of the 36 first-place votes; Alabama received seven, Arizona State five, and Ohio State three.

References

College football rankings